Model Multiple College is one of the colleges located in Janakpur-4, Ram chowk.
It is a private educational institution of Nepal. The principal is Pramendra Thakur. MMC was established in 2053 B.S.

References

Universities and colleges in Nepal
1996 establishments in Nepal
Buildings and structures in Janakpur